Counterstrike may refer to:

 Counter-Strike, a video game series
 Counter-Strike (video game), a 2000 modification of the video game Half-Life
 Counter-Strike: Condition Zero, a 2004 video game
 Counter-Strike: Source, a 2004 video game
 Counter-Strike: Global Offensive, a 2012 video game
 Counterstrike, an expansion pack for the video game Command & Conquer: Red Alert
 "Counterstrike", a season 10 Stargate SG-1 episode
 Counterstrike (1969 TV series)
 Counterstrike (1990 TV series)
 Counterstrike (drum and bass group)
 "Counterstrike the Mp3", a song by Basshunter from The Old Shit (2006)

See also 
 Counterattack (disambiguation)
 Second strike